Stockach is a town in the district of Konstanz, in southern Baden-Württemberg, Germany.

Location
It is situated in the Hegau region, about 5 km northwest of Lake Constance, 13 km north of Radolfzell and 25 km northwest of Konstanz.

Stockach includes the central city and 10 villages:

History

The Counts of Nellenburg founded Stockach in the 13th century, the town receiving town privileges in 1283. In 1401 to the Landgraviate of Nellenburg owned the towns of Engen, Tengen, Radolfzell, Stockach, 125 villages, 9 abbeys and 4 mailing stations.

The Counts of Nellenburg became extinct in 1422 and their estates were acquired by the House of Habsburg in 1465; hence Stockach was a part of Further Austria until 1805. In the Swabian War of 1499 the troops of the Three Leagues besieged the town but failed to capture it.

During the War of the Spanish Succession, Elector Maximilian II Emanuel of Bavaria set fire to Stockach. During the French Revolutionary Wars of the Second Coalition two battles were fought here between the French First Republic and the Habsburg monarchy in 1799 and 1800. In 1810 Stockach finally fell to the Grand Duchy of Baden.

Politics

Parties in the Ratshaus

Twin towns
Stockach is twinned with:

  La Roche-sur-Foron, France, since 1972

Notable personalities
 Rudolf von Buol-Berenberg (1842-1902), German politcian, president of German Reichstag (German Empire)
 1993 Franz Ziwey (born 1932), 24 years mayor of Stockach 
 Marc Dumitru (born 1986), actor and performer in House of Anubis

References

External links

 

Konstanz (district)
Hegau